Øyvind Julnes Gram (born 11 October 1985) is a retired Norwegian football striker.

In 2005, he won the Norwegian Football Cup with Molde.

Gram has had many injuries and, in April 2009, was operated on for the third time in a year.

After a spell with Gefle, he returned in winter 2011 and signed for Vik IL. In July 2012 he joined FK Bergen Nord.

References

External links
Profile at Aalesunds FK official page
mfkweb.org > spillere > Øyvind gram

1985 births
Living people
Norwegian footballers
SK Træff players
Molde FK players
Lyn Fotball players
Aalesunds FK players
Eliteserien players
Gefle IF players
Allsvenskan players
Norwegian expatriate footballers
Expatriate footballers in Sweden
Norwegian expatriate sportspeople in Sweden
People from Lørenskog
Association football midfielders
Sportspeople from Viken (county)